Passiflora trifasciata is an endangered species of South American passionflower, native to the area spanning Ecuador to western Bolivia. Classified in subgenus Decaloba and supersection Decaloba, it is a liana with variegated leaves and small, fragrant white flowers.

References 

trifasciata
Taxa named by Charles Antoine Lemaire
Plants described in 1868